The New Brunswick Interscholastic Athletic Association, or NBIAA, is the governing body for high school sports in New Brunswick, Canada. As with all of Canada's provincial high school athletics associations, the NBIAA is an affiliate member of the United States-based National Federation of State High School Associations (NFHS) and School Sport Canada (SSC).

Events
The NBIAA hosts 17 sport events:

Fall sports
Baseball
Cross country
Field hockey
Football
Golf
Soccer
Softball
Swimming

Winter sports
Basketball
Cheerleading
Hockey
Wrestling

Spring sports
Badminton
Rugby union
Track and field
Volleyball

References

External links
NBIAA/ASINB Website
NBIAA 2012 - 2013 Calendar

Inter
Organizations based in Fredericton